Nigricans, a Latin word meaning black, may refer to :
 Acanthosis nigricans, a brown to black, poorly defined, velvety hyperpigmentation of the skin
 Ulmus americana 'Nigricans', an American elm cultivar
 Ulmus glabra 'Latifolia Nigricans', a wych elm cultivar
 a cultivar of Pittosporum tenuifolium, a small evergreen tree native to New Zealand